The KUR EC1 class, later known as the EAR 50 class and the EAR 51 class, was a class of  gauge  Garratt-type articulated steam locomotives operated by Kenya-Uganda Railway (KUR) and the East African Railways (EAR).

Service history
The first twenty members of the class were built in 1927 by Beyer, Peacock & Co. in Manchester, England, for the KUR.  They entered service in 1928, and, with two exceptions, were later operated by the KUR's successor, the EAR, as its 50 class.

The remaining two members of the EC1 class were built and entered service in 1930, and were different in some respects.  They later became the EAR's 51 class.

All of the former EC1 class members were withdrawn from service in the 1950s. Most of their leading bogies (trucks) were salvaged for use in converting EAR 13 class locomotives from s to s, to address the 13 class's initial tendency to de-rail when operating in reverse.

Class list
The builder's numbers, build years, fleet numbers and names of each member of the EC1 class were as follows:

See also
Rail transport in Kenya
Rail transport in Uganda

References

Notes

Bibliography

External links

Beyer, Peacock locomotives
East African Railways locomotives
Garratt locomotives
Kenya-Uganda Railway locomotives
Metre gauge steam locomotives
Railway locomotives introduced in 1927
Scrapped locomotives
Steam locomotives of Kenya
Steam locomotives of Uganda
4-8-2+2-8-4 locomotives